Forward Sports is a Pakistani multi-national company based in Sialkot, Punjab that makes sports equipment, primarily soccer balls. It produces 750,000 balls per month for global brands including Adidas. It was founded in 1991 by Khawaja Masood Akhtar. It started working with Adidas in 1994 and since then it has produced balls for many international events including UEFA Champions League on several occasions. It was the official provider of balls for the 2014 FIFA World Cup (the Brazuca), the 2018 FIFA World Cup (the Telstar 18) and the 2022 FIFA World Cup (the Al Rihla).

It produces soccer balls, handballs, sala balls, beach balls, indoor balls, sports bags, shin guards, goalkeeping gloves and medicine balls. It is the largest football producer in Pakistan, employing 3,000 people including 900 women.

The company has come into prominence for landing the contract of over 3,000 "Brazuca" balls that were used at the FIFA World Cup 2014 in Brazil. Bloomberg and BBC are among many news agencies that have covered the company. Khawaja Masud Akhtar received the Sitara-i-Imtiaz on 23 March 2019.

Affiliates
The Forward Sports has an affiliated company based in Egypt, the Forward Egypt which manufactured a portion of the Adidas Al Rihla.

See also 
List of largest companies in Pakistan

References

External links

Privately held companies of Pakistan
Pakistani companies established in 1991
Manufacturing companies established in 1991
Sportswear brands
Sporting goods manufacturers of Pakistan
Companies based in Sialkot
Pakistani brands